Cayo Levantado Port or Samana Port or Fondeaderon Port is located in Arroyo Barril, Samana, Dominican Republic.

Overview

Port of Samana was built in 1977 as a free commercial port to deposit or commercialize non-taxes products.
It does not receive any container operations, and it is currently with non-regular operations.

Port information

 Location: 
 Local time: UTC−4 
 Weather/climate/prevailing winds:  From May 15 until September 15
 Climate: mostly sunny, tropical. Hurricane  season runs from June to November 
 Prevailing winds: direction ENE–ESE
 Average temperature range: 28–30 °C

See also 
 List of ports and harbours of the Atlantic Ocean

References 

 Samana Port (Spanish)

Buildings and structures completed in 1977
Ports and harbours of the Dominican Republic
Urban planning in the Dominican Republic
Buildings and structures in Samaná Province